The Siddhar (Tamil: சித்தர் cittar, from Sanskrit: siddha) in Tamil tradition is a perfected individual, who has attained spiritual powers named siddhi. Their one of the objectives may be to experience the Sivam (the supreme God) in their respective human frame.

Historically, Siddhar also refers to the people who were early age wandering adepts that dominated ancient Tamil teaching and philosophy. Some Siddhars are iconoclastic rebels whose thoughts are against the organized settled beliefs among the people.  They are knowledgeable in science, technology, astronomy, literature, fine arts, music, drama, dance, and provided solutions to common people in their illness and advice for their future. Some of their ideologies are considered to have originated during the First Sangam period.

Practice
Siddhars were typically first scientists, saints, doctors, alchemists, and mystics all in one. They wrote their findings in the form of Tamil poems on palm leaf manuscripts. These are still owned by some families in Tamil Nadu and handed down through the generations, as well as being kept in  universities in India, Germany, Great Britain, and the United States.

In this way, Siddhars developed the native Siddha medicine system. A rustic form of healing that is similar to Siddha medicine has since been practiced by experienced elders in the villages of Tamil Nadu. This is referred to as Paatti Vaitthiyam" (grandmother's medicine) "Naattu marunthu (folk medicine) and Mooligai marutthuvam (herbal medicine).

Siddhars are also believed to be the founders of Varma kalai - a martial art for self-defense and medical treatment at the same time. Varmam are specific points located in the human body which when pressed in different ways can give various results, such as disabling an attacker in self-defense, or balancing a physical condition as an easy first-aid medical treatment.

Tamil Siddhars were the first to develop pulse-reading ("naadi paarththal" in Tamil) to identify the origin of diseases.

Siddhars have also written many religious poems. It is believed that most of them have lived for ages, in a mystic mountain called Sathuragiri, near Thanipparai village in Tamil Nadu.

Siddhars 
The Abithana Chintamani encyclopedia states that the Siddhars are of the 18 persons listed below, but sage Agastya states that there are many who precede and follow these.

The 18 Siddhars

There are 18 siddhars in the Tamil Siddha tradition. They are
 Nandeeswarar
 Tirumular
 Agastya
 Kamalamuni
 Patanjali
 Korakkar 
 Sundaranandar
 Konganar
 Sattamuni
 Vanmeegar
 Ramadevar
 Dhanvanthri
 Idaikkadar
 Machamuni 
 Karuvoorar
 Bogar
 Pambatti Siddhar
 Kuthambai

Apart from the 18 siddars listed above, there is another list of 18 siddars who represent the 9 navagrahas (two siddars represent each navagraha) all navagraha doshas /pariharams are performed to the siddars as Siddar Velvi (siddar havan). The details of the 18 siddars who represent the 9 navagrahas are as follows:
 Sri Sivavakkiyar Siddhar Moon
 Sri Kailaya Kambili Sattai Muni Siddar - Moon
 Sri Bhogar siddar - Mars
 Sri Kaagapujandar siddar - Jupiter
 Sri Pullipanisiddar - Mars
 Sri Sattai Muni siddar- Kethu
 Sri Agapaisiddar - Jupiter
 Sri Azhugani siddar -Raghu
 Sri Kudambai siddar - Kethu
 Sri Vallalarsiddar - Mercury
 Sri Edaikaddar siddar -Mercury
 Sri Pattinathar siddar- Sun
 Sri Kaduvelli siddar- Sun
 Sri Kanjamalai siddar - Venus
 Sri Sennimalai siddar- Venus
 Sri Kapilar siddar -Saturn
 Sri Karuvoorar siddar-Saturn
 Sri Pambatti siddar -Raghu

There is a universal shrine for all the 18 Siddars at Madambakkam in Chennai called SriChakra Mahameru Sri Seshadri Swamigal 18 siddars Vrindavana Sakthi Peedam built under the instruction from Sathguru Sri Seshadri Swamigal by Guruji.

The supreme Siddhar is Lord Shiva himself.

Powers of siddhar 
The Siddhars are believed to have had both major and minor powers which are described in detail in various yogic and religious texts. They also are said to have the power of converting their mass to energy and thereby traveling to different universes.

 Anima (shrinking) -- Power of becoming the size of an atom and entering the smallest beings
 Mahima (illimitability) -- Power of becoming mighty and co-extensive with the universe. The power of increasing one's size without limit
 Laghima (lightness) -- Capacity to be quite light though big in size
 Garima (weight) -- Capacity to weigh a lot, though seemingly being small in size
 Prapti (fulfillment of desires) -- Capacity to enter all the worlds from Brahma Loga to the nether world. It is the power of attaining everything desired
 Prakasysm (irresistible will) -- Power of disembodying and entering into other bodies and going to heaven and enjoying what everyone aspires for, simply from where he stays
 Ishtavam (supremacy) -- Have the creative power of God and control over the Sun, Moon and the elements
 Vashitavam (dominion over the elements) -- Power of control over kings and gods. The power of changing the course of nature and assuming any form

These eight are the Great Siddhis (Ashtama siddhis), or Great Perfections.

Some verses from Siddhars' writings 

There are various text related to health, virtue, medicine, social equality, yoga, etc., are available in  Tamil language

The sample verses are as below:

See also
 Abithana Chintamani
 Avvaiyar
 Ayyavazhi mythology
 Bogar
 Mahasiddha
 Maruttuvar community
 Nayanars
 Siddha
 Tirumandhiram

Notes and references

External links 
 Thamizh Siddhars Info Page
 Shaivism Home page
 The 18 Siddhars
 18 Siddhar details
 Tamil Virtual Academy

Tamil-language literature
Tamil history

Tamil Hindu literature